St. Mark's Episcopal Church (Wadsworth Congregational Church or Old Mennonite Church) is a historic church at 146 College Street, Wadsworth, Ohio.

Built in 1842, it was added to the National Register of Historic Places in 1973. Final service was March 6, 2022.

References

External links

Churches completed in 1842
Churches on the National Register of Historic Places in Ohio
Episcopal churches in Ohio
Greek Revival church buildings in Ohio
Mennonite church buildings in Ohio
National Register of Historic Places in Medina County, Ohio
United Church of Christ churches in Ohio
Wadsworth, Ohio
19th-century Episcopal church buildings